Cham Seyyedi-ye Olya (also Romanized as Cham Seyyedī-ye ‘Olyā and Cham Şeyd-e ‘Olyā) is a village in Hemmatabad Rural District, in the Central District of Borujerd County, Lorestan Province, Iran. At the 2006 census, its population was 71, in 12 families.

References 

Towns and villages in Borujerd County